Forma is an American electronic band from Brooklyn. The group released two full-length albums for Spectrum Spools in 2011 and 2012. After a lineup change (John Also Bennett replaced founding member Sophie Lam), they released an EP for NYC techno label The Bunker New York in 2014. In September 2016, Forma released Physicalist, a full-length album for long standing ambient label Kranky. Physicalist was the first Forma recording to utilize acoustic instrumentation, including music composed on piano, flute and percussion instruments.

Members
Mark Dwinell - Synthesizers, Piano.
George Bennett - Drum Programming, Percussion.
John Also Bennett - Synthesizers, Piano, Flute.

Former members
Sophie Lam - Synthesizers

Discography
Forma (Spectrum Spools, 2011)
Off/On (Spectrum Spools, 2012)
 Cool Haptics EP (The Bunker New York, 2014)
 Physicalist (Kranky, 2016)
 Semblance (Kranky, 2018)

References

Musical groups from New York (state)